8th Regiment may refer to:

Philippine Commonwealth
 8th Infantry Regiment (Philippine Commonwealth Army)
 8th Infantry Regiment (Philippine Constabulary) - The military establishment of the 8th Infantry Regiment of the Philippine Constabulary was active on 1944 to 1946 under the U.S. military command during the Liberation and stationed in Cebu and Bohol.

United States
 8th Regiment Missouri Volunteer Cavalry
 8th Regiment Alabama Infantry
 8th Marine Regiment (United States)
 8th Cavalry Regiment (United States)
8th Infantry Regiment (United States)

United Kingdom
 8th (The King's) Regiment of Foot